Power Struggle (2019) was a professional wrestling event promoted by New Japan Pro-Wrestling (NJPW). It took place on November 3, 2019, in Osaka, Osaka, at the Osaka Prefectural Gymnasium. It was the ninth event under the Power Struggle name.

Storylines
Power Struggle featured nine professional wrestling matches that involved different wrestlers from pre-existing scripted feuds and storylines. Wrestlers portrayed villains, heroes, or less distinguishable characters in the scripted events that built tension and culminated in a wrestling match or series of matches.

Results

References

External links
The official New Japan Pro-Wrestling website

2019 in professional wrestling
21st century in Osaka
Events in Osaka
2019
November 2019 sports events in Japan
Professional wrestling in Osaka